Ivania Wong (born 23 September 1997) is an Australian rugby union player.

Biography 
Wong started in her international debut for Australia against Fiji on 6 May 2022 at the Suncorp Stadium in Brisbane. She also started against Japan in her second test cap for the Wallaroos on 10th May at the Bond Sports Park in the Gold Coast.

Wong was named in the Australian squad for the 2022 Pacific Four Series. She started against the Black Ferns in the opening match of the Pacific Four series on 6 June. She was later named in the Wallaroos squad for a two-test series against the Black Ferns at the Laurie O'Reilly Cup. She was selected in the team again for the delayed 2022 Rugby World Cup in New Zealand.

References

External links
Wallaroos Profile

1997 births
Living people
Australia women's international rugby union players
Australian female rugby union players
21st-century Australian women